Clubhouse is a social audio app for iOS and Android where users can communicate in audio chat rooms that accommodate groups of thousands of people. 

Clubhouse led to the emergence of a new social media segment known as social audio or drop-in audio. Soon realizing the potential of this segment, a handful of companies came out with their social audio solutions as standalone products or as an expansion to their current products. Clubhouse being the pioneer in this segment, all competitors eventually adapted its features to their products.

History
Clubhouse began as a social media startup by founders Paul Davison and Rohan Seth in Fall 2019. Originally designed for podcasts under the name Talkshow, the app was rebranded as "Clubhouse" and officially released for the iOS operating system in March 2020. Clubhouse was valued at $100 million after receiving funding from notable angel investors, including Ryan Hoover (Product Hunt), Balaji Srinivasan (Coinbase), James Beshara (Tilt.com), and several venture capitalists, including a $12 million Series A investment from the venture capital firm, Andreessen Horowitz, in May 2020.

The app gained popularity in the early months of the COVID-19 pandemic and had 600,000 registered users by December 2020. In January 2021, CEO Paul Davison announced that the app's active weekly user base consisted of approximately 2 million individuals. The company announced that it would begin working on an Android version of the app. In that month, the app became widely used in Germany when German podcast hosts Philipp Klöckner and Philipp Gloeckler started an invite-chain over a Telegram group, bringing German influencers, journalists, and politicians to the platform. Clubhouse also raised their Series B at a $1 billion valuation.

On February 1, 2021, Clubhouse had an estimated 3.5 million downloads globally and grew rapidly to 8.1 million downloads by February 15. This significant growth in popularity occurred after celebrities such as Elon Musk and Mark Zuckerberg made appearances on the app. In that month, Clubhouse hired an Android Software Developer. A year after the app's release, the number of weekly active users was greater than 10 million, but the user base declined 21% during three weeks from late February to early March. The decline is reportedly caused by a decrease in the number of Clubhouse users after its initial release. During its initial rollout, the app was accessible only by invitation, and  invitation codes on eBay were selling at up to $400.

On April 5, 2021, Clubhouse partnered with Stripe to launch its first monetizing feature called Clubhouse Payments. Although testing began with only 1,000 users, after a week, the company rolled out the functionality to another 60,000 or more users in the US. In the same month, Twitter had entered discussions to purchase Clubhouse for $4 billion. The talks ended with no acquisition. Later, the company raised their Series C round of funding at a $4 billion valuation. The app also received interest in a partnership, with the National Football League announcing a content deal that month. On May 9, 2021, Clubhouse launched a beta version of the Android app for users in the US, and on May 21, 2021, Clubhouse became available worldwide for Android users.

In July 2021, Clubhouse announced its partnership with TED to offer exclusive talks. and on July 21, 2021, the company discarded its invitation system and made the application available to all, though a waitlist for registration is still applied as user accounts will be created over time to manage new traffic. As of the time of the announcement, the company stated it had 10 million users on the waitlist. On September 23, 2021, the company announced a new feature called "Wave." In October 2021, Clubhouse rolled out new features called "Replays and Clips". In April 2022, the company rolled out a new dark mode on its iOS and Android apps.

Features

Rooms 
The main feature of Clubhouse is real-time virtual “rooms” in which users can communicate with each other via audio. Rooms are categorized based on differing levels of privacy. “Open rooms” can be joined by anyone on Clubhouse, and all rooms default to this setting on creation. In “social rooms,” only users followed by the moderators are allowed to join. Users need to receive an invite from the moderators to join “closed rooms.” Within a room, there are three sections: the “stage,” “followed by the speakers,” and “others in the room.” The profile picture and name of each user present in a room are displayed in the appropriate section. When a user creates a room, they are assigned the role of “moderator” which gives them the power to call users to the stage, mute users, and remove speakers from the stage. The moderator role is denoted by a green star that appears next to the user's name. When a user joins a room, they are initially assigned to the role of a “listener” and cannot unmute themselves. Listeners can notify the moderators of their intent to join the stage and speak by clicking on the “raise hand” icon. Users who are invited to the stage become “speakers,” and gain the ability to unmute themselves. Users can exit a room by tapping the “leave quietly” button or the peace sign emoji.

Clubhouse is now rolling out Houses, a private space where people can gather away from the larger "rooms". Houses are like small clubs.

Events 
A lot of conversations in Clubhouse happen spontaneously, but users can schedule conversations by creating events. When scheduling an event, users can first name the event and then set the date and time that the conversation will begin. Users can also add co-hosts to help moderate the event. Once an event is created, it is added to the Clubhouse “bulletin.” The bulletin displays upcoming scheduled events and allows users to set notifications for events by clicking the bell icon corresponding to the event. Users can access the bulletin by clicking on the calendar icon at the top of the home page.

Clubs 
At the Clubhouse, clubs are user communities that regularly discuss a common interest. Many clubs are present in Clubhouse representing a wide array of topics and users can find clubs by name under the search tab. A club consists of three categories of users - “Admin”, “Leader", and “Member”. Members can create private rooms and invite more users into the club. Leaders have all the privileges of a member, also authorized to create/schedule club-branded open rooms. An admin can modify club settings, add/delete users, change user privileges and create/schedule any type of room. There are three types of clubs - “Open”, “By Approval”, and “Closed” for membership. Any user can join an open club by pressing the "Join The Club" button on the club profile. In case of approval, users need to apply and wait for membership by pressing the "Apply To Join" button on the club profile. The admins of the respective club are privileged to accept or reject the user's request. In a closed club, membership is limited to users selected by the club admin. All users of a club will be notified when a public room within the club is created. The club creation is restricted to active users and whoever creates the club will become the club admin. Eligible users can create a club by going to their profile,  press the “+” sign located in the “Member of” section. Clubs in which a user is a member are shown on their profile page. The first club to 1/2 a million members was the "Human Behaviour' Club founded by The Digital Doctor (Dr. Sohaib Imtiaz).

Backchannel 
Backchannel is the messaging function that allows users to interact individually or within a group via text. The Backchannel feature was initially leaked on June 18, 2021, in response to the launch of Spotify Greenroom. This is notable because, until this point, Clubhouse was voice only with no way to hyperlink or message. It was entirely dependent on Instagram and Twitter for text messaging. The feature was initially leaked in the App Store, which the company says was an accident on Twitter. A month later, after multiple failed attempts, the Clubhouse Backchannel finally launched on July 14, 2021.

Explore 
The homepage of Clubhouse provides access to ongoing chat rooms, which are recommended based on the people and clubs that are followed by the user. By tapping the magnifying glass icon, users will be redirected to the explore page. On the explore page, users can search for people and clubs to follow and also find conversations categorized by topics.

Clubhouse Payments 
This is the direct payment service provided by the app, which allows users to send money to content creators who had enabled this functionality in their profile. Users may send money to a creator by clicking on their profile, press "Send Money", and enter the desired amount to send. When a user does this for the first time, they'll be prompted to register a credit or a debit card. The total received amount will go to the creator. The user will also be charged a small card processing fee according to Clubhouse's payment processing partner, Stripe.

Creator First
Clubhouse Creator First is an accelerator program intended to help content creators on Clubhouse build their audience and monetize their content with a direct payment system.

Creator First paid $5,000 a month to 24 creator shows for 90 days as it failed to secure any sponsorships for the creators. The pilot program drew heavy criticism from users over lack of transparency over the selection criteria and terms of the Creator First contracts.

Icon 
Clubhouse app icon is a regularly changing grayscale profile photo of a social change leader and platform users. This is unique in app development, as most companies hire a designer to create an icon, whereas Clubhouse harvests user photos instead.

Running list of Clubhouse app icons
February 2023 to Present - Shayla Washington, Kezaira aka Zee Zee Williams, Ebony Green
December 2022 to February 2023 - Ryma Krimi AKA Lady Hustler, Eduardo Verastegui AKA Lalo, Hiromi Okuyama
October 2022 to December 2022 - Tehran, Mary Amini, Parisa Rose
September 2022 to October 2022 - Prayerna
August 2022 to September 2022 - Bryan Hall, Logan Houston and Julian Lewis
May 2022 to August 2022 - Daniel Anderson and Calista Wu
May 2022 - Pyotr Kurzin and Anna Olizarivska
March 2022 to May 2022 - Tashari Berry, Ashley Grigsby and Deandra "Deon" Whitby
February 2022 to March 2022 - Francesca Hogi
December 2021 to February 2022 - Abraxas Higgins
November 2021 to December 2021 - Anirudh Deshmukh
October 2021 to November 2021 - Mandiie Martinez
August 2021 to October 2021 - Leah Lamarr
July 2021 to August 2021 - Justin "Meezy" Williams
June 2021 to July 2021 - Dandara Pagu
May 2021 to June 2021 - Drue Kataoka
February 2021 to May 2021 - Axel Mansoor 
December 2020 to February 2021 - Bomani X

Wave 
This functionality allows users to notify others that they are available for a private chat. This feature may be one way for the company to provide less scheduled and more personal interactions on the app.

Recording 
This feature lets creators record entire conversations or 30-second clips. These recordings can be shared off-platform, which the company hopes will encourage user growth.

Platforms 
Clubhouse app is available on Android and iOS platforms. Users can download the App from their respective stores. The Android customer requires Android 7 or above to launch the app. iOS consumers need iOS 13 or later to run the app.

Pierre Stanislas and Philippe Breuils have developed a free third-party desktop client (Mac and Windows) for Clubhouse, called Clubdeck. This app is noteworthy because it provides multiple features not available in the official Clubhouse app, including the ability to add a soundboard to your rooms.

Technical 
The Clubhouse Android app is written in Kotlin while the iOS app is written in React Native. The backend for the app is written in Python and Django. It runs on a Gunicorn server with HAProxy for load balancing.

Business model 
Presently Clubhouse works using funds supplied by its investors. The company intends to monetize the platform via tips, paid events, subscriptions, and connecting creators with brand partners.

Tipping was rolled out in April 2021 but only to select users within the United States. The company promised sponsorships to its Creator First shows, but only three of the 23 shows selected landed a sponsor (only one of which is reportedly tied to the program).

Two Clubhouse personalities were signed by Endeavor to talent representation contracts: Nait Jones and NYU Girls Roasting Tech Guys.

Other social audio apps like Discord Stage Channels, Facebook Live Audio Rooms, Reddit Talk, Slack Huddles, Spotify Greenroom, Telegram Voice Chats, and Twitter Spaces all directly compete with Clubhouse.

Criticism

Privacy 
Clubhouse records audio in the virtual rooms to support incident investigations. When a discussion is reported of violating Clubhouse's rules, the audio of the associated room will be reviewed by the staff. In the absence of a report, the room's recording is automatically deleted when the session ends. Clubhouse does not explicitly explain the review process.

In April 2021, an SQL database with 1.3 million Clubhouse user records was published on a hacker forum. It contained real names, social media user names, and other account information. Clubhouse issued a statement on the incident on social media, stating that they did not experience a breach of their systems. The company stated that the data is already accessible to the public and can be accessed by anyone through their application or API.

Censorship 
In February 2021, China  banned Clubhouse. Before the ban, Clubhouse attracted a significant amount of Chinese users to discuss various topics, including politically sensitive topics, such as protests in Hong Kong and the political status of Taiwan, which became the main reason for ban. In early March 2021, The UAE reportedly throttled access to the app, making access in the country impossible. Later, mid-month, Oman blocked Clubhouse for not having a proper license to operate. Jordan also blocked the app for conducting sensitive conversations late that month.

Controversy 
The Clubhouse Guidelines forbid the recording, transcription, reproduction, or sharing of conversations without explicit permission. This has been a source of controversy as cases of bullying, harassment, and racism, such as antisemitism, have occurred on the app. Numerous incidents of antisemitism have been reported.

Hate rallies 
Clubhouse is known to harbor various hate rallies, including those spreading antisemitism, Islamophobia, Hinduphobia, and incel ideology. In May 2021, LaKeith Stanfield found himself moderating a room where some users shared antisemitic viewpoints. Complaints were also made in September 2020 and April 2021. Following her  anti-Muslim remarks in a room hosted by a PR consultant, far-right figure Laura Loomer was suspended for  Islamophobia.

See also

 Spoon Radio
 Zello

References

External links 
 
 Clubhouse Forum and Community

IOS software
Social audio
Mobile applications
2020 software
2020s fads and trends
Internet properties established in 2020
Freeware
Internet culture
Social networking services
Companies based in San Francisco